John Lionel Salmon (31 March 1934 – 22 May 2021) was an Australian cricketer. He played fifteen first-class cricket matches for Victoria between 1953 and 1959 as an opening bowler.

See also
 List of Victoria first-class cricketers

References

External links
 

1934 births
2021 deaths
Australian cricketers
Victoria cricketers
Cricketers from Melbourne
People from Canterbury, Victoria